Cecil Blanche Woodham-Smith ( Fitzgerald; 29 April 1896 – 16 March 1977) CBE was a British historian and biographer. She wrote four popular history books, each dealing with a different aspect of the Victorian era.

Early life
Cecil Woodham-Smith was born in 1896 in Tenby, Wales. Her family, the Fitzgeralds, were a well-known Irish family, one of her ancestors being Lord Edward Fitzgerald, hero of the Irish Rebellion of 1798. Her father Colonel James FitzGerald had served in the Indian Army during the Sepoy Mutiny; her mother's family included General Sir Thomas Picton, a distinguished soldier who was killed at Waterloo.

She attended the Royal School for Officers' Daughters in Bath, until her expulsion for taking unannounced leave for a trip to the National Gallery. She finished her schooling at a French convent and afterwards entered St Hilda's College, Oxford. She graduated with a second-class degree in English in 1917.

In 1928 she married George Ivon Woodham-Smith, a distinguished London solicitor with whom she had an exceptionally close and deep relationship until his death in 1968. She possessed a gift for historical writing, but postponed her career until her two children had gone off to boarding school. In the meantime, she wrote pot-boilers under the pseudonym Janet Gordon; this training was to stand her in good stead as an historian, as she mastered the art of writing entertaining narrative.

Career
Her first book as a historian, a biography of Florence Nightingale published in 1950, took her straight to the top of her profession. Her meticulous research had taken nine years, and the book succeeded in restoring Nightingale's reputation, which had dwindled following Lytton Strachey's representation of her in Eminent Victorians. Acclaimed for its combination of scholarship and readability, Florence Nightingale won the James Tait Black Award for biography.

Her next book was equally well received. The Reason Why (1953) was a study of the Charge of the Light Brigade, a military disaster during the Crimean War and one of the defining events of the Victorian age. It became her most popular book, and afterwards she explained to a television audience how she wrote the Charge itself: working at a gallop through thirty-six hours non-stop without food or other break until the last gun was fired, when she poured a stiff drink and slept for two days. Though the work was critically acclaimed, it came to the conclusion that the allies had lost the Crimean War, which most historians conclude is not true.

She produced two more notable works. The first was The Great Hunger: Ireland: 1845-1849 (1962), a history of the Great Irish Famine of the 1840s that was critical of the British government's handling of the famine, in particular singling out Sir Charles Edward Trevelyan for criticism, although she did acknowledge that the British government assisted during the first phase of the famine.  The second was the first volume of Queen Victoria: Her Life and Times (1972). She was unable to complete the next volume of the biography, and died in London in 1977 at the age of 80.

Cecil Woodham-Smith was appointed CBE in 1960. She received honorary doctorates from the National University of Ireland in 1964 and the University of St Andrews in 1965. She also became an honorary fellow of St Hilda's College (her alma mater) in 1967.

Alan Bennett wrote of her:Cecil was a frail woman with a tiny bird-like skull, looking more like Elizabeth I (in later life) than Edith Sitwell ever did (and minus her sheet metal earrings). Irish, she had a Firbankian wit and a lovely turn of phrase. ‘Do you know the Atlantic at all?’ she once asked me and I put the line into Habeas Corpus and got a big laugh on it. From a grand Irish family she was quite snobbish; talking of someone she said: ‘Then he married a Mitford … but that’s a stage everybody goes through.’ Even the most ordinary remark would be given her own particular twist and she could be quite camp. Conversation had once turned, as conversations will, to fork-lift trucks. Feeling that industrial machinery might be remote from Cecil’s sphere of interest I said: ‘Do you know what a fork-lift truck is?’ She looked at me in her best Annie Walker manner. ‘I do. To my cost.’

References

External links
LibraryThing author profile
The Great Hunger, Reference 

British biographers
1896 births
1977 deaths
Alumni of St Hilda's College, Oxford
People educated at the Royal School for Daughters of Officers of the Army
People from Tenby
Great Famine (Ireland)
Women biographers
Welsh people of Irish descent
James Tait Black Memorial Prize recipients
20th-century British historians
20th-century British women writers
British women historians
Historians of Ireland
20th-century pseudonymous writers
Pseudonymous women writers